Gert Bolmer (born April 25, 1983, in Almelo, Netherlands) is a professional horse rider competing in dressage. He is grade II disabled.

Career
Apart from numerous participations in national as well as international contests, he is best known for
his participation in the Equestrian events of recent Paralympic Games:
2000 Summer Paralympics in Sydney, Australia
2004 Summer Paralympics in Athens, Greece.

In the 2000 Summer Paralympics he earned a silver medal for the team test and a bronze medal for the freestyle to music. In the 2004 Summer Paralympics he won two bronze medals for both team and individual dressage.

He also participated in the 1999 world championship where he finished third in the team test, individual dressage and freestyle to music. In the following 2003 world championship he also finished third in the same categories except the team test where he finished fifth. The European championship of 2003 again yielded him two third places in the same categories as well as a fourth place for the team test.

External links
 
 

1983 births
Living people
Dutch male equestrians
Dutch dressage riders
Paralympic equestrians of the Netherlands
Paralympic silver medalists for the Netherlands
Paralympic bronze medalists for the Netherlands
Paralympic medalists in equestrian
Equestrians at the 2000 Summer Paralympics
Equestrians at the 2004 Summer Paralympics
Equestrians at the 2012 Summer Paralympics
Medalists at the 2000 Summer Paralympics
Medalists at the 2004 Summer Paralympics
Sportspeople from Almelo
20th-century Dutch people
21st-century Dutch people